Hakim Sahabo (born 16 June 2005) is a professional footballer who plays as a midfielder for Lille II. Born in Belgium, he plays for the Rwanda national team.

Club career
Sahabo is a youth product of KVC Willebroek-Meerhof, Beerschot, Anderlecht, Genk, Mechelen, and Lille. He began his senior career with Lille's reserves in 2022.

International career
Sahabo was born in Belgium to a Burundian father and Rwandan mother. He made his international debut with the Rwanda national team in a friendly 0–0 tie with Sudan on 17 November 2022.

References

External links
 
 

2005 births
Living people
Sportspeople from Brussels
Rwandan footballers
Rwanda international footballers
Belgian footballers
Rwandan people of Burundian descent
Belgian people of Rwandan descent
Belgian people of Burundian descent
Association football midfielders
Lille OSC players
Championnat National 3 players
Rwandan expatriate footballers
Rwandan expatriates in France
Belgian expatriate footballers
Belgian expatriates in France
Expatriate footballers in France